Bautahaugen Samlinger (Bautahaugen collections) is a small museum in Hedalen, Sør-Aurdal municipality, Norway. The museum is a subsidiary of Valdres Folkemuseum.

History
Bautahaugen was founded in 1902, by local trader Erik J. Bergsrud (1848–1915) and farmer Elling Goplerud (1864–1932). Bautahaugen Samlinger is located in the central part of Hedalen, in a small forest overlooking the valley and with the mountains framing the landscape.

Today there are 15 buildings and 2,500 individual objects in the museum. Bautahaugen consists of a collection of old buildings and objects from Hedalen, one of the oldest villages in Valdres. All of the buildings at the museum are from small local farms and include houses used for hunting and fishing in the nearby mountains and the valleys of Vassfaret and Vidalen. Hedal stave church is situated a bit further up in Hedalen.

See also
Bagn Bygdesamling

References

External links
 Bautahaugen Samlinger
 Bautahaugen Samlinger in Valdres Museum
Hedalen website

Museums in Innlandet
Sør-Aurdal
Open-air museums in Norway